The 2006 BMW Championship was the 52nd edition of the BMW Championship, an annual professional golf tournament on the European Tour. It was held 25–28 May at the West Course of Wentworth Club in Virginia Water, Surrey, England, a suburb southwest of London.

David Howell cruised to a five stroke victory over Simon Khan to claim his first BMW Championship.

Course layout

Past champions in the field 
Nine former champions entered the tournament.

Made the cut

Missed the cut

Nationalities in the field

Round summaries

First round 
Thursday, 25 May 2006

Second round 
Friday, 26 May 2006

Third round 
Saturday, 27 May 2006

Final round 
Sunday, 28 May 2006

Scorecard

Cumulative tournament scores, relative to par

Source:

References 

BMW PGA Championship
Golf tournaments in England
BMW Championship
BMW Championship
BMW Championship